The title of Duc de Dalberg was created by the French Emperor Napoleon I on 14 April 1810 for Emmerich von Dalberg, the nephew of Karl Theodor von Dalberg, Prince-Primate of the Confederation of the Rhine and Grand Duke of Frankfurt. He died on 27 April 1833. His daughter and heiress married firstly Sir Richard Acton, 7th Baronet (by whom she was the mother of John Dalberg-Acton, 1st Baron Acton) and secondly Granville George Leveson-Gower, 2nd Earl Granville, but as the Duke had no sons, the title became extinct.

However, by decree of the Emperor Napoleon III, 2 March 1859, the extinct Dalberg dukedom was revived and extended to the Emmerich de Dalberg's first cousin twice removed, Charles de Tascher de La Pagerie (who was also a second cousin once removed of Napoleon III), and redesignated as Duc de Tascher de La Pagerie. It became extinct again at the death of Charles's son Louis Robert in 1902, though the senior branch of the Tascher de La Pagerie family (who were unrelated to the 1st Duc de Dalberg but distant relatives of Empress Josephine de Beauharnais) later illegally assumed the ducal title.

Ducs de Dalberg, later de Tascher de La Pagerie (1810)
Emmerich Joseph Franz Heinrich Felix Dismas Kämmerer von Worms gt. von Dalberg, 1st Duc de Dalberg (1773-1833)
Charles Joseph Louis Robert Philippe de Tascher de La Pagerie, 2nd Duc de Tascher de La Pagerie (1811-1869)
Louis Robert de Tascher de La Pagerie, 3rd Duc de Tascher de La Pagerie (1840-1902)

fr:Famille de Tascher#Liste des ducs de Tascher de La Pagerie